The Geraldton Express was a newspaper established in Geraldton, Western Australia

It was founded in 1878. On 1 January 1929 it amalgamated with the other Geraldton newspaper, the Geraldton Guardian (established in 1878), and was published as The Geraldton Guardian and Express, an evening daily.

See also
 List of newspapers in Australia
 List of newspapers in Western Australia

References

External links 
 Available at Trove:

Publications established in 1878
Newspapers published in Western Australia
1878 establishments in Australia
1929 disestablishments in Australia
Geraldton
Newspapers on Trove